The Glooscap Trail is a scenic roadway in the Canadian province of Nova Scotia.

It is located in the central and northern part of the province around the Minas Basin and Cobequid Bay, sub-basins of the Bay of Fundy.  The route connects Amherst in Cumberland County, near the interprovincial boundary with New Brunswick, with Scot's Bay in Kings County, Nova Scotia. A spur of Glooscap Trail follows Trunk 2 in Truro, through the Shubenacadie Valley, to Enfield at the boundary with Halifax Regional Municipality. The Fundy Shore segment branches off from the main route in Parrsboro and continues along the Minas Basin shore until reaching Advocate Harbour, where the route then follows the Chignecto Bay, outlining the Chignecto Peninsula.

The main route measures , with the Shubenacadie Valley spur being . Additionally, the Fundy Shore segment is 119 km (74 mi) long.

Name
According to a Mikmaq legend, Glooscap was a giant god-like man who was created by Gisoolg (the Great Spirit Creator) and lived on the high cliffs of Cape Blomidon, overlooking the Bay of Fundy.  He was created by a lightning bolt striking sand.
The legend credits Glooscap with creating the Five Islands in the Minas Basin.  These islands were formed from giant clods of mud thrown by Glooscap at a disrespectful beaver (the beaver's dam had flooded Glooscap's garden).  Glooscap smashed the beaver's dam and allowed the water to flow freely, creating the Bay of Fundy tides.

Communities include 
Truro
Onslow
Masstown
Glenholme
Great Village
Bass River
Economy
Five Islands
Parrsboro
Springhill
Amherst
Green Oaks
Beaver Brook
Clifton
Old Barns
Maitland
Selma
Noel Shore
Densmore Mills
Minasville
Moose Brook
Tenecape
Walton
Pembroke
Cambridge
Bramber
Cheverie
Kempt Shore
Summerville
Centre Burlington
Brooklyn
Windsor
Wolfville
Belnan
Port Greville
Advocate Harbour
Apple River
Joggins
Maccan
Diligent River
Fox River
Spencers Island

Parks
Five Islands Provincial Park
Cape Chignecto Provincial Park

Museums
Fundy Geological Museum
Joggins Fossil Cliffs and Centre.
Age of Sail Museum
Bass River Heritage Museum
Ottawa House Museum

Lighthouses 

 Apple River Lighthouse
 Cape D'or Lighthouse
 Spencers Island Lighthouse
 Port Greville Lighthouse
 Parrsboro Lighthouse
 Bass River Lighthouse
 Burntcoat Head Lighthouse
 Walton Harbour Lighthouse

Highways
Trunk 1
Trunk 2
Trunk 14 
Route 215
Route 236
Route 209
Route 242

References

External links
Glooscap Trail

Roads in Kings County, Nova Scotia
Roads in Colchester County
Roads in Hants County, Nova Scotia
Roads in Cumberland County, Nova Scotia
Scenic travelways in Nova Scotia